The 2014 J.League Division 1 season was the 49th season of top-flight football in Japan, and the 22nd since the establishment of the J.League in 1993. The season began on 1 March and ended on 8 December. Sanfrecce Hiroshima were the defending champions.

Due to Japan's participation in the 2014 FIFA World Cup, there was an extended break to allow for preparation after the 14th-week matches on 17 and 18 May, with the league resuming on 15 July for four clubs who participated in the 2014 AFC Champions League to play rescheduled 12th-week matches, and 19 July for other 14 clubs.

2014 saw the league played via a home and away system over a single season for the last time until at least 2020. From 2015 the league will revert to an Apertura and Clausura system, with a multi-team play-off 'super stage' to decide the champions, similar to the format used when the J.League began.

The league was won by Gamba Osaka, who won their second J.League title following a 0–0 away draw against Tokushima Vortis. They became the second league champions (after Kashiwa Reysol) to win the first division after being promoted as second division champions.

Clubs

18 teams compete in this year's competition. Both Gamba Osaka and Vissel Kobe return to J1 after a single season outside the top flight; they finished as the J.League Division 2 champions and runners-up, respectively. Tokushima Vortis, who finished fourth in the regular season and won the promotion playoff, will make their top-flight debut, becoming the first club from Shikoku to do so. Those three teams replaced Oita Trinita, Shonan Bellmare and Júbilo Iwata; Júbilo were relegated from J1 for the first time after twenty seasons in the top tier, while Bellmare and Trinita were bumped down after cameo appearances in J1.

Foreign players

Managerial changes

League table

Positions by round

Results

Top scorers

Updated to games played on 8 December 2014
Source: J. League Data

Awards

Individual

Best Eleven

* The number in brackets denotes the number of times that the footballer has appeared in the Best 11.

Attendances

References

J1 League seasons
1
Japan
Japan